SS Nubia was a passenger-cargo steamer built for the Peninsular and Oriental Steam Navigation Company by Caird & Company of Greenock, Scotland, at a cost of £100,000 and launched on 13 December 1894.

History
Originally named SS Singapore, she was 430 feet long and 49 feet 4 inches in beam, with a three-cylinder triple expansion steam engine and a top speed of 14.5 knots. She had a capacity of 90 first-class and 62 second-class passengers and also carried cargo.

Nubia began her maiden voyage on 1 March 1895 bound for Calcutta, India, but ran aground 18 days later in Banden Fukon Bay, Aden. She was refloated, repaired, and resumed operations. In January 1899, five crewmen of the North Lancashire Regiment died aboard Nubia after a cholera outbreak believed to have been caused by fruit taken on board in Port Said, Egypt. Between 1899 and 1903, Nubia was used for transportation and treating patients during the Second Boer War.

References

Ships of P&O (company)
1894 ships
Ships built on the River Clyde
Steamships of the United Kingdom
Maritime incidents in 1895
Maritime incidents in 1899
Maritime incidents in 1915
Shipwrecks in the Bay of Bengal